Luigi Pianciani (10 August 1810 – 17 October 1890) was an Italian politician and Freemason. He was born in and was twice mayor of Rome. He died in Spoleto.

Bibliography
  Stato Maggiore Esercito italiano, Corpo dei Volontari Italiani (Garibaldi), Fatti d'armi di Valsabbia e Tirolo, 1867.
  Gualtiero Castellini, Pagine garibaldine (1848-1866),  Torino, Ed. Fratelli Bocca, 1909.

 U. Zaniboni Ferino, Bezzecca 1866. La campagna garibaldina dall'Adda al Garda, Trento 1966.
 
 Filippo Mazzonis, Luigi Pianciani: frammenti, ipotesi e documenti per una biografia politica, Ateneo 1992.

 Raffaele Villari, Da Messina al Tirolo, a cura di Achille Ragazzoni, “Passato Presente”, Storo 1995.
 Livio Toschi, Luigi Pianciani Sindaco di Roma, Istituti editoriali e poligrafici internazionali, 1996.
 Atti del Convegno Luigi Pianciani e la democrazia moderna, Spoleto, novembre 2005.

External links
 

1810 births
1890 deaths
19th-century Italian politicians
Mayors of Rome
Italian Freemasons